Nachum Eliezer Rabinovitch (30 April 1928 – 6 May 2020), born Norman Louis Rabinovitch, was a Canadian-Israeli Religious Zionist rabbi and posek. He headed the London School of Jewish Studies from 1971 to 1982, and the hesder yeshiva Birkat Moshe in Ma'ale Adumim from 1982 until his death.

Early life and education
Nahum Rabinovitch was born in Montreal, Quebec to Sarah (née Weiner) and Sam Rabinovitch. After completing an eight-year course of studies under Rabbi Pinchas Hirschsprung, Rabinovitch received semicha from Montreal's Yeshivas Merkaz HaTorah in the city's first rabbinical ordination ceremony.

After obtaining an honours degree in commerce from Sir George Williams College, he left for Baltimore to pursue a Master of Science degree in mathematics at Johns Hopkins University. While there, he studied at Yeshivas Ner Yisroel, where he received a second ordination from Rabbi Yaakov Yitzchok Ruderman.

Career
Between 1955 and 1963, Rabinovitch served as spiritual leader of the Brith Sholom Beth Israel Congregation in Charleston, South Carolina. In this role, he helped establish the city's first Jewish day school, of which he served as principal. He also held appointments as lecturer in mathematics at the College of Charleston and chaplain to the Sixth Naval District Headquarters.

In 1963, he was called to serve as a community rabbi in Toronto, and assumed the pulpit of the Clanton Park Synagogue in Downsview. He completed a Ph.D. in the philosophy and history of mathematics at the University of Toronto in 1971 under the supervision of Kenneth O. May. His doctoral thesis, Probability and Statistical Inference in Ancient and Medieval Jewish Literature, was published as a monograph in 1973.

Rabinovitch was appointed principal of Jews' College in early 1970, and settled in London that spring. Notable among his students at the college was Chief Rabbi Lord Jonathan Sacks, who has cited Rabinovitch as his primary role model. Ten years later, he accepted an offer to become rosh yeshiva of Yeshivat Birkat Moshe, a hesder institution in Ma'ale Adumim.

In 2015, together with a group of prominent Israeli rabbis, Rabinovitch established Giyur Kehalacha, an independent beit din offering conversions outside of the Chief Rabbinate.

Philosophical and political views
Rabinovitch published Halakhic rulings on various subjects, including organ donation, surrogacy, birth control, army service, Shabbat, and kashrut. His philosophical approach, influenced by Maimonidean rationalism, emphasized the connection between philosophy and Halakha, between Torah and scientific studies, and between theoretical learning and practical applications.

Rabinovitch was an authority on the writings of Maimonides, about which he published numerous books and essays. He is perhaps best known for his fourteen-volume Yad Peshuta ( "Outstretched Hand"), an in-depth commentary on Maimonides' Mishneh Torah. He also authored Melumdei Milḥamah ( "Learned in War"), a collection of responsa dealing with Halakhic issues facing religious members of the Israel Defense Forces.

Rabinovitch was a religious Zionist, a supporter of the settlement movement, and a vocal opponent of the Oslo Accords and the Disengagement. He was, however, often more liberal in social and religious matters than many in the religious Zionist movement. In an interview, Rabinovitch said that he backed religious studies for women, and did not see a problem in Halakhic decisions taken by women. Nonetheless, he signed a letter in 2019 agreeing with the Chief Rabbinate's opposition to religious Jewish women serving in the IDF. He also ruled that it is incumbent on Israeli combat medics and doctors to treat and save the lives of Palestinian combatants, even if wounded in the course of attacking Israelis. Rabinovitch characterized Christianity and Islam positively, as movements that spread monotheism, morality, and messianic hope. In addition, Rabinovitch differed from many other religious Zionist leaders in that he did not view the State of Israel as a harbinger of the Messiah and argued for greater separation between religion and state in Israel. Often, his iconoclastic positions were deeply influenced not only by Jewish tradition, but by the core ideas of political liberalism as well.

In 1995, Rabinovitch was among a group of rabbis accused of indirectly influencing Yigal Amir to assassinate Prime Minister Yitzhak Rabin, having branded Rabin a moser and likened his government to Nazis. The previous summer, he had also issued a ruling that Jewish soldiers should disobey any government orders to vacate West Bank army bases.

Personal life 
Rabinovitch had six children, including British journalist Dina Rabinovitch (born in 1963), who died in 2007 of breast cancer.

Selected works

Books

Articles

References

Bibliography 

 Brill, Alan (7 June 2020). "Rabbi Nahum Rabinovitch on Philosophy of Halakhah". The Book of Doctrines and Opinions: Notes on Jewish Theology and Spirituality. Retrieved 11 August 2020.
 Nadler, Allan (Summer 2018). "Maimonides in Ma'ale Adumim". Jewish Review of Books.
 Schwartz, Rami (2021). "The Political Theology of Rabbi Nachum Eliezer Rabinovitch". The Torah u-Madda Journal. 18: 1–32.

1928 births
2020 deaths
20th-century American rabbis
Academics of the London School of Jewish Studies
Anglophone Quebec people
Canadian emigrants to Israel
Canadian Orthodox rabbis
Clergy from Montreal
English Orthodox rabbis
Historians of mathematics
Israeli Orthodox rabbis
Israeli Rosh yeshivas
Johns Hopkins University alumni
Maimonides scholars
People from Ma'ale Adumim
Philosophers of mathematics
Religious Zionist Orthodox rabbis
Religious Zionist rosh yeshivas
Sir George Williams University alumni
University of Toronto alumni
20th-century Canadian rabbis
20th-century English rabbis
20th-century Israeli rabbis